Chinese Food Made Easy by Ching He Huang is a 6-part cooking show on television commissioned and shown by BBC Two and BBC HD.

Overview
The series presents Ching's versions of Chinese food, including Sichuan (Szechuan) food, noodles, dim sum, seafood, fast food, desserts and celebratory food, where she presents a complete banquet.

Episodes
In the first episode of the series, Ching teaches the rower Katherine Grainger how to cook a healthy version of sweet and sour pork. In another episode, Ching presents a Chinese style version of fish and chips.

Many of the ingredients she uses are grown or made in the UK, for example chillies from Chorley, tofu from Melton Mowbray, soy sauce from Wales and pak choi from Preston.

Broadcasts
Chinese Food Made Easy has been licensed to the Cooking Channel (USA) and networks in New Zealand, Germany, Iceland, Poland and Australia. BBC's Lifestyle channel offers it on its Asian feeds, including China, Hong Kong, Taiwan, Singapore and Korea.

Publications
A recipe book also called Chinese Food Made Easy accompanies the TV series.

References
TV Ratings The Guardian
Last night's TV – It's China season on TV, it seems, so here's some yummy Chinese food The Guardian
BBC unveils chefs' specials The Guardian
Chinese Food Made Easy Scores Asian Deal World Screen
Yes, take them away The Herald
Ching's new TV Show Daily Record
Markets to star on Television Chorley Borough Council
Interviews: Ching-He Huang Radio86
Ching He Huang Daily Record]
Chinese style fish & chips The Wine Boutique
Blog goddess: Ching-he Huang deliciousmagazine.co.uk

External links
 
 Chinese Food Made Easy IMDb
 Official Lifestylefood website
 BBC HD Teaser
 Chinese Food Made Easy Lion Television production information
Chinese food fans tune in to Huang ITN
Chinese Food Made Easy Yum Yum Asia
Chinese Food Made Easy Our Chinese Food blog

BBC Television shows
2008 British television series debuts
British cooking television shows
Chinese cookbooks
2000s British cooking television series